Andy Stirling (born 3 March 1961) is Professor of science and technology policy at Sussex University. He has a background in the natural sciences, a master's degree in archaeology and social anthropology (Edinburgh) and a D.Phil. in science and technology policy (Sussex).

Formerly a board member of Greenpeace International, Stirling has worked in collaboration with a diverse range of organisations. His research interests include technological risk, innovation policy, scientific uncertainty and public involvement in decision-making, and he has been involved in developing some participatory appraisal methods.

He has served on several policy advisory committees, including the UK Government's Advisory Committee on Toxic Substances and GM Science Review Panel as well as the European Commission's Expert Group on Science and Governance.

References

External links
Scientists take on Brown over nuclear plans

1961 births
Living people
Alumni of the University of Edinburgh
People associated with energy
British environmentalists
Academics of the University of Sussex
People associated with Greenpeace